The 2014–15 Kent Invicta Football League season was the fourth in the history of the Kent Invicta Football League, a football competition in England.

League table

The league featured 15 clubs which competed in the division last season, along with one new club:
Sheppey United, promoted from the Kent County League

Also, Fleet Leisure changed their name to Gravesham Borough.

League table

References

External links
 Kent Invicta Football League

Kent Invicta Football League seasons
10